Kagbeni may refer to;

 Kagbeni, Mustang, village in the Dhaulagiri Zone, Nepal
 Kagbeni (film), Nepalese film